Sébastien Foucan (born 27 May 1974 in Paris) is a French freerunner.

He is the founder of freerunning and considered an early developer of parkour. Known for his views on the philosophy of parkour and freerunning, Foucan stresses the need for training in the basics of both for individual safety and to maintain a positive public perception of the activities.

In 2002, Foucan featured in a television advertisement for the Nike Presto running shoe. He became known in the United Kingdom after Mike Christie's Channel 4 documentary Jump London in September 2003 and the subsequent documentary Jump Britain. In addition to those programmes, Foucan appeared as Mollaka in the James Bond film Casino Royale. He spent three months in the Bahamas on the film. Foucan appeared in the music video for Madonna's 2005 single "Jump", accompanying the singer on her 2006 "Confessions Tour". He helped K-Swiss develop the Ariake, the first in a line of five freerunning-shoe models. Foucan appeared in a trailer for the game Mirror's Edge.

It was reported on 3 January 2012 that Foucan would be among 15 celebrities in the seventh series of Dancing on Ice. On 19 February he was eliminated in a double Ultimate Skills skate-off with Heidi Range.

Foucan has also won World Chase Tag PRO 2 GO Europe  with the team he founded and created, Blacklist. He was the star of the tournament, defeating teams from around the continent. Blacklist also finished 3rd/4th in World Chase Tag 4, mainly due to Foucan.

Freerunning 

Foucan attributed the name free running to Guillaume Pelletier, who he had worked with at the time of Jump London. The word "freerunning" was coined during the filming of Jump London to present Parkour to the English-speaking world. Since then it has come to represent Foucan's methodology, which focuses on innovation and expression rather than Parkour's speed and efficiency.

Foucan explains freerunning:

Foucan has described the core value

He defines Freerunning as a discipline for self-development, following one's own way. Foucan's dissatisfaction with Parkour's limited creativity and self-expression motivated him to develop a similar art of movement which became known as freerunning.

He reported that he was forced to define free running as a discipline separate from parkour because others had rejected his practice as not being within their definition of parkour. For example, David Belle and other Parkour enthusiasts have criticized Foucan and freerunning:

Foucan has described freerunning as a process of movement aimed at self-development through physical activity, play, and creativity. He regards it as an act symbolic of leaving "fixed path and social systems".

Foucan appeared in series 4 and 5 of Ninja Warrior UK.

Filmography
Acting
 Casino Royale (2006) as Mollaka
 The Tournament (2009) as Anton Bogart
 The Antwerp Dolls (2015) as Marco
 Creators: The Past (2020) as Tammuz

Stunts
 The Tournament
 55 Degrees North (TV series) Episode #1.1 freerunning performer (2004)

References

External links
 
 
 Sébastien Foucan in British Documentary "Jump Britain" at Google Video

Living people
1974 births
Parkour
Freerunners
Traceurs
Male actors from Paris
French stunt performers
French sportspeople
French people of Guadeloupean descent
French male film actors
Ninja Warrior UK contestants